Percy Wyndham may refer to:

 Percy Charles Wyndham (1757–1833), English Member of Parliament for Chichester 1782–1784, and for Midhurst 1790–1796
 Percy Wyndham (soldier) (1833–1879), British soldier and adventurer in the Battle of Thoroughfare Gap
 Percy Wyndham (1835–1911), English Conservative Party politician
 Percy Wyndham, 1st Earl of Thomond

See also
 Percy